Subhaspally Bidyaniketan is a school in Burnpur, Asansol. The school is located near the Burnpur bus stand.

About School
The school was established in the year of 1964. This is H.S school under W.B.H.S.E board having girls and boys section separately. The morning session is for girls and the day session is for boys. The school also has a primary section for class 1, 2, 3 and 4.  The school offers science, arts and commerce in H.S.

See also
Education in India
List of schools in India
Education in West Bengal

References

External links

Primary schools in West Bengal
High schools and secondary schools in West Bengal
Schools in Paschim Bardhaman district
Education in Asansol
Educational institutions established in 1964
1964 establishments in West Bengal